Sir Ralph Norman Angell (26 December 1872 – 7 October 1967) was an English Nobel Peace Prize winner. He was a lecturer, journalist, author and Member of Parliament for the Labour Party.

Angell was one of the principal founders of the Union of Democratic Control. He served on the Council of the Royal Institute of International Affairs, was an executive for the World Committee against War and Fascism, a member of the executive committee of the League of Nations Union, and the president of the Abyssinia Association. He was made a Knight Bachelor in 1931 and awarded the Nobel Peace Prize in 1933.

Biography

Angell was one of six children, born to Thomas Angell Lane and Mary (née Brittain) Lane in Holbeach, Lincolnshire, England. He was born Ralph Norman Angell Lane, but later adopted Angell as his sole surname. He attended several schools in England, the Lycée Alexandre Ribot at Saint-Omer in France, and the University of Geneva, while editing an English-language newspaper published in Geneva.

In Geneva, Angell felt that Europe was "hopelessly entangled in insoluble problems". Then, still only 17, he emigrated to the West Coast of the United States, where he for several years worked as a vine planter, an irrigation-ditch digger, a cowboy, a California homesteader (after filing for American citizenship), a mail-carrier, a prospector, and then, closer to his natural skills, as a reporter for the St. Louis Globe-Democrat and later the San Francisco Chronicle.

Due to family matters he returned to England briefly in 1898, then moved to Paris to work as a sub-editor on the English-language Daily Messenger, and then as a staff contributor to the newspaper Éclair. He also through this period acted as French correspondent for some American newspapers, to which he sent dispatches on the progress of the Dreyfus case. During 1905–12, he became the Paris editor for the Daily Mail.

He returned to England and, in 1914, he was one of the founders of the Union of Democratic Control. He joined the Labour Party in 1920 and was parliamentary candidate for Rushcliffe in the general election of 1922 and for Rossendale in 1923. He was MP for Bradford North from 1929 to 1931; after the formation of the National Government, he announced his decision not to seek re-election on 24 September 1931. In 1931 he was knighted for his public and political services, and in 1933 he was presented with the Nobel Peace Prize. He stood unsuccessfully for the London University seat in 1935.

From the mid-1930s, Angell actively campaigned for collective international opposition to the aggressive policies of Germany, Italy, and Japan. He went to the United States in 1940 to lecture in favour of American support for Britain in World War II, and remained there until after the publication of his autobiography in 1951. He later returned to Britain and died at the age of 94 in Croydon, Surrey.

He married Beatrice Cuvellier but they separated and he lived his last 55 years alone. He purchased Northey Island, Essex, which is attached to the mainland only at low tide, and lived in the sole dwelling on the island.

His Nobel Peace Prize medal and accompanying scroll are held by the Imperial War Museum.

The Great Illusion

Angell is most widely remembered for his 1909 pamphlet, Europe's Optical Illusion, which was published the following year (and many years thereafter) as the book, The Great Illusion. (The anti-war film La Grande Illusion took its title from his pamphlet.) The thesis of the book was that the integration of the economies of European countries had grown to such a degree that war between them would be entirely futile, making militarism obsolete. This quotation from the "Synopsis" to the popular 1913 edition summarizes his basic argument.

During World War I, British historian and polemicist G. G. Coulton authored a purported refutation of Angell's pamphlet.

The Money Game
Angell was also the designer of The Money Game, a visual method of teaching schoolchildren the fundamentals of finance and banking. First published in 1928 by J. M. Dent & Sons, The Money Game, How to Play It: A New Instrument of Economic Education was both a book and a game. The bulk of the book was an essay on money and a discussion of economic theory, it also contained a summary of the game's story and an explanation of the rules.

Influence
Angell's book The Press and the Organisation of Society is cited as a source in F. R. Leavis' pamphlet Mass Civilisation and Minority Culture (1930). Vera Brittain quoted Angell's statement on "the moral obligation to be intelligent" several times in her work.

Works
 (As Ralph Lane) Patriotism under Three Flags: A Plea for Rationalism in Politics (1903)
 
 
 America and the New World State (in U.S., 1912)
 War and the Workers (1913)
 
 
 
 
 The World's Highway (1916)
 The Dangers of Half Preparedness (1916, in U.S.)
 War Aims: The Need for a Parliament of the Allies (1917)
 Why Freedom Matters (1917)
 The Political Conditions of Allied Success: A Protective Union of the Democracies (1918, in U.S.)
 The Treaties and the Economic Chaos (1919)
 The British Revolution and the American Democracy (1919)
 
 The Press and the Organization of Society (1922)
 If Britain is to Live (1923)
 Foreign Policy and Human Nature (1925)
 Must Britain Travel the Moscow Road? (1926)
 The Public Mind: Its Disorders: Its Exploitation (1927)
 The Money Game: Card Games Illustrating Currency (1928)
 
 Can Governments Cure Unemployment? (1931, with Harold Wright)
 From Chaos to Control (1932)
 The Unseen Assassins (1932)
 The Great Illusion—1933 (1933)
 The Menace to Our National Defence (1934)
 Preface to Peace: A Guide for the Plain Man (1935)
 The Mystery of Money: An Explanation for Beginners (1936)
 This Have and Have Not Business: Political Fantasy and Economic Fact (1936)
 Raw Materials, Population Pressure and War (1936, in U.S.)
 The Defence of the Empire (1937)
 Peace with the Dictators? (1938)
 Must it be War? (1938)
 The Great Illusion—Now (1939)
 For What do We Fight? (1939)
 You and the Refugee (1939)
 Why Freedom Matters (1940)
 America's Dilemma (1941, in U.S.)
 Let the People Know (1943, in U.S.)
 The Steep Places (1947)
 After All: The Autobiography of Norman Angell (London: Hamish Hamilton, 1951; rpt. New York: Farrar, Straus and Young, 1952).  [Out of print.]

Further reading
 Martin Ceadel, Living the Great Illusion: Sir Norman Angell, 1872–1967; Oxford University Press, 2009
 J. D. B. Miller, Norman Angell and the Futility of War; Macmillan, 1986
 Michael Meadowcroft, "Norman Angell" in Brack & Randall (eds.) The Dictionary of Liberal Thought; Politico's, 2007, pp. 9–11
 Alberto Castelli, The Peace Discourse in Europe (1900–1945), Routledge, 2019, pp. 21–37.

See also
History of money
Nobel Peace Prize

References

External links

 
 OMD 5620: Nobel Peace Prize Gold Medal 1933, iwm.org.uk 
  including the Nobel Lecture, 12 June 1935 Peace and the Public Mind
 
 Sir Norman Angell Papers, Archives and Special Collections, Ball State University Libraries (PDF)
 
 
 
 Norman Angell, On Human Nature (1913)
 

1872 births
1967 deaths
English academics
English agnostics
English expatriates in Switzerland
English male writers
English Nobel laureates
English political writers
Knights Bachelor
Labour Party (UK) MPs for English constituencies
League of Nations people
Nobel Peace Prize laureates
Non-interventionism
People from Holbeach
Politics of Bradford
St. Louis Globe-Democrat people
UK MPs 1929–1931
Writers from Lincolnshire
Lecturers